Acharagma is a genus of two cactus species from northern Mexico.

Description
These cacti are usually solitary but sometimes occur in small clusters. The globose stems tend to be about 3–7 cm in diameter. The ribs have tubercles, with ungrooved areoles.

The genus is of relatively recent creation, the species originally being described as part of Escobaria, although recognized as a separate section by Nigel Taylor in 1983, and  raised to a genus by Charles Glass in 1998.

Species
, Plants of the World Online accepts two species. A third possible species, A. huasteca, described in 2011, is considered to be a synonym of Acharagma roseanum subsp. galeanense.

References

 Edward F. Anderson, The Cactus Family (Timber Press, 2001), pp. 108–109
 Zsolt Elhart, CactusWorld 29(2): 105. 2011

External links

Cactoideae genera
Cacti of Mexico
Endemic flora of Mexico
Flora of Coahuila
Cactoideae